Siva Ramachandran Athreya (born 1971) is an Indian probability theorist specialising in  statistical physics and population biology.

He graduated in mathematics from St Stephen's College, Delhi, went to ISI in Kolkata and Bangalore where he completed his masters, obtained his PhD degree from University of Washington in 1998 under the supervision of
Krzysztof  Burdzy.  He was awarded the Shanti Swarup Bhatnagar Prize for Science and Technology in 2012, the highest science award in India,  in the mathematical sciences category.

References

1971 births
Living people
Indian statisticians
21st-century Indian mathematicians
Recipients of the Shanti Swarup Bhatnagar Award in Mathematical Science